The Apostolic Palace is the official residence of the pope, the head of the Catholic Church, located in Vatican City. It is also known as the Papal Palace, the Palace of the Vatican and the Vatican Palace. The Vatican itself refers to the building as the Palace of Sixtus V, in honor of Pope Sixtus V, who built most of the present form of the palace.

The building contains the papal apartments, various offices of the Catholic Church and the Holy See, private and public chapels, Vatican Museums, and the Vatican Library, including the Sistine Chapel, Raphael Rooms, and Borgia Apartment. The modern tourist can see these last and other parts of the palace, but other parts, such as the Sala Regia (Regal Room) and Cappella Paolina, had long been closed to tourists, though the Sala Regia allowed occasional tourism by 2019. The Scala Regia (Regal Staircase) can be viewed from one end and used to enter the Sala Regia. The Cappella Paolina remains closed to tourists.

History 
In the 5th century, Pope Symmachus built a papal palace close to the Old St. Peter's Basilica which served an alternative residence to the Lateran Palace. The construction of a second fortified palace was sponsored by Pope Eugene III and extensively modified under Pope Innocent III in the twelfth century.

Upon returning to Rome in 1377 after the interlude of the Avignon Papacy, which saw Rome subject to civil unrest and the abandonment of several Christian monuments, the popes chose to reside first at Basilica di Santa Maria in Trastevere and then at Basilica di Santa Maria Maggiore. The Vatican Palace had fallen into disrepair from lack of upkeep, and the Lateran Palace underwent two destructive fires, in 1307 and 1361, which resulted in irreparable harm. In 1447, Pope Nicholas V razed the ancient fortified palace of Eugene III to erect a new building, the current Apostolic Palace.

In the 15th century, the palace was placed under the authority of a prefect. This position of Apostolic Prefect lasted from the 15th century until the 1800s, when the Papal States fell into economic difficulties. In 1884, when this post was reviewed in light of saving money, Pope Leo XIII created a committee to administer the palace.

The major additions and decorations of the palace are the work of the following popes for 150 years. Construction of the current version of the palace began on 30 April 1589 under Pope Sixtus V and its various intrinsic parts were completed by later successors, Pope Urban VII, Pope Innocent XI and Pope Clement VIII. In the 20th century, Pope Pius XI built a monumental art gallery and museum entrance.

Construction of the Papal Palace (also known as the Apostolic Palace or Vatican Palace) at the Vatican in Vatican City, took place mainly between 1471 and 1605. Covering 162,000 square metres (1,743,753 square feet), it contains the papal apartments, offices of the Roman Catholic Church and Holy See, chapels, Vatican Library, museums and art galleries.

Structure 

The Apostolic Palace is run by the Prefecture of the Pontifical Household. The palace is more accurately a series of self-contained buildings within the well-recognized outer structure which is arranged around the Courtyard of Sixtus V (Cortile di Sisto V). It is located northeast of St Peter's Basilica and adjacent to the Bastion of Nicholas V and Palace of Gregory XIII.

The Apostolic Palace houses both residential and support offices of various functions as well as administrative offices not focused on the life and functions of the pope himself.

Sistine Chapel 

Perhaps the best known of the palace chapels is the Sistine Chapel named in honor of Sixtus IV (Francesco della Rovere). It is famous for its decoration that was frescoed throughout by Renaissance artists including Michelangelo, Sandro Botticelli, Pietro Perugino, Pinturicchio, Domenico Ghirlandaio, and others.

One of the primary functions of the chapel is as a venue for the election of each successive pope in a conclave of the College of Cardinals. In this closed-door election, the cardinals choose a successor to the traditionally first pope, St. Peter, who is traditionally buried in the crypts of nearby St. Peter's Church.

Raphael Rooms

This suite of rooms is famous for its frescos by a large team of artists working under Raphael. They were originally intended as a suite of apartments for Pope Julius II. He commissioned Raphael, then a relatively young artist from Urbino, and his studio in 1508 or 1509 to redecorate the existing interiors of the rooms entirely. It was possibly Julius' intent to outshine the apartments of his predecessor (and rival) Pope Alexander VI, as the Stanze are directly above Alexander's Borgia Apartments. They are on the third floor, overlooking the south side of the Belvedere Courtyard.

From east to west, as a visitor would have entered the apartment, but reversing the sequence in which the Stanze were frescoed, and also the route of the modern visitor, the rooms are the Sala di Constantino ("Hall of Constantine"), the Stanza di Eliodoro ("Room of Heliodorus"), the Stanza della Segnatura (the earliest and the most admired) ("Room of the Signature") and the Stanza dell'Incendio del Borgo ("The Room of the Fire in the Borgo").

After the death of Julius in 1513, with two rooms frescoed, Pope Leo X continued the program. Following Raphael's death in 1520, his assistants Gianfrancesco Penni, Giulio Romano and Raffaellino del Colle finished the project with the frescoes in the Sala di Costantino.

Borgia Apartments 

The Borgia Apartments is a suite of rooms in the palace adapted for personal use by Pope Alexander VI (Rodrigo de Borja). He commissioned the Italian painter Pinturicchio to lavishly decorate the apartments with frescoes.

The paintings and frescoes, which were executed between 1492 and 1494, drew on a complex iconographic program that used themes from medieval encyclopedias, adding an eschatological layer of meaning and celebrating the supposedly divine origins of the Borgias.

The rooms are variously considered a part of the Vatican Library and Vatican Museums. Some of the rooms are now used for the Vatican Collection of Modern Religious Art, inaugurated by Pope Paul VI in 1973.

Clementine Hall 

The Clementine Hall was established in the 16th century by Pope Clement VIII in honor of Pope Clement I, the third pope. Like other chapels and apartments in the palace, the hall is notable for its large collection of frescos and other art.

Gallery

See also 

 Domus Sanctae Marthae
 Index of Vatican City-related articles

Notes

References 
 
 
 

 
Episcopal palaces
Geography of Vatican City
Official residences
Palaces in Rome
Palaces in Vatican City
Sistine Chapel
Sites of papal elections
Official residences in Vatican City